Roberto Salcedo Aquino (born 26 November 1943) is a Mexican politician, civil servant, teacher and writer. He has served as Secretariat of the Civil Service in the Cabinet of Mexico since 2021.

References 

1943 births
Living people
21st-century Mexican politicians

National Autonomous University of Mexico alumni
People from Mexico City
Cabinet of Andrés Manuel López Obrador